The California state tartan is the official Scottish Tartan pattern of California, created July 23, 2001 and defined under law in California Government Code § 424.3(a). It was designed by J Howard Standing of Tarzana, California, and Thomas Ferguson, Sydney, British Columbia. Any resident of the state may claim the tartan and the design as described in state law states that the tartan is a pattern or sett consisting of alternate squares of meadow-green and Pacific blue that are separated and surrounded by narrow charcoal bands.  The squares of meadow-green are divided by a gold seam that is supported by charcoal lines on each side.  There are three redwood stripes, the middle of which is broader, that are added to each side of the gold seam.  The Pacific blue square is divided by a sky-blue stripe, which is supported on each side by charcoal lines.

The tartan is closely based of the Muir tartan named after John Muir who was an environmentalist and botanist from California.

The tartan is specifically defined by the following weave code:
 Y..B..G...S..G...S..G...S..G...B...A...B..K...  Ancient Colors
 8..2..20..4..20..8..20..4..20..32..56..2..8...  Full Pivots

This weave code means that the threads begin with 8 threads of yellow, followed by 2 threads of black, 20 threads of green, 4 threads of scarlet, 20 threads of green, 8 threads of scarlet, 20 threads of green, 4 threads of scarlet, 20 threads of green, 32
threads of black, 56 threads of azure, 2 threads of black, and 8 threads of sky blue.  At that point the weave pivots and returns, beginning with 2 threads of black, and continuing the sequence in reverse order through 8 threads of yellow, at which point it pivots back again.

External links
California State Insignia page from the California State Library

References

United States state tartans
Tartan
2001 introductions